Maranatha is sludge metal band from Ohio. The band consists of vocalist, guitarist, and drummer, Collin Simula, vocalist and bassist, Jack Huston, guitarist Darrell Chess and drummer Wes Jackson.

History

Maranatha started in 2011 as a solo project of Collin Simula, former drummer and bassist for Symphony in Peril and drummer for Kingsblood. Simula independently released their debut EP, Incarnate, in 2012. In 2013, he independently released the second EP, Spiritless, that featured Nick Nowell of The Famine.

Simula added his longtime friend Jack Huston to play bass and do co-vocals. As of 2014, the band has two vocalists.

The band released their debut full-length album, Filth on July 24, 2015, via New American Records.

Members
Current members
 Collin Simula – vocals, guitars (2011–present), drums (2011-2017) (formerly of Symphony In Peril and Kingsblood)
 Jack Huston – vocals, bass (2013–2014 [as Live], 2014–present) (White Wolves)
 Darrell Chess – guitars (2017–present) (Northern Widows)
 Wes Jackson – drums (2017–present) (Northern Widows)

Live
 Chris Thompson – guitar (2013–2017) (Sleepers Awake, White Wolves)
 Chris "Ambrose" Burnsides – drums (2013–2017) (Sleepers Awake, White Wolves)
 Danny – drums (2013)

Discography
EPs
 Incarnate (2012)
 Spiritless (2013)
Splits
 Sanhedrin/Maranatha (2012)
Studio albums
 Filth (2015)

References

Musical groups established in 2012
2012 establishments in Ohio